Simson Raja, popularly known as Pattimandram Raja, is an Indian television personality popular for his speeches in Tamil-language talk shows (Pattimandram). His speeches in the debate talk shows, moderated by Solomon Pappaiah, made him famous among the Tamil households around the world. He used to anchor a daily talk show called Vaanga Pesalaam broadcast in Sun TV. Raja is a banker by profession. He graduated from The American College in Madurai and has acted in the few popular Tamil movies Sivaji, Guru En Aalu, Idharkuthane Aasaipattai Balakumara, Mappillai and Ko.

Career
'Pattimandram' Raja' was born in a village called Keezhamathur near Madurai. His parents were teachers in a school in the village. He completed his school studies from St. Britto Higher school in Madurai. After pursuing B.com., degree from American College, Madurai, Raja studied M.A.,(Journalism and Mass communications) in Madurai Kamaraj University. He worked for United Bank of India from 1984 to 2019.

Raja has travelled with Solomon Pappaiah to many countries and became popular as a debate speaker. He rose to fame by his witty, intelligent and humorous speeches throwing light of information on various areas in the famous Pattimandram show telecasts during festival times on Sun TV. He also gave valuable current affair information through the talk shows like Vaanga Pesalam aired in Sun TV. Raja has staged more than 9,000+ shows across the world including United States, United Kingdom, France, Australia, Japan, Middle East, Seychelles, South Africa, Singapore, Southeast Asia, Sri Lanka.

Filmography

References

External links
 

Tamil male actors
Living people
Television personalities from Tamil Nadu
Male actors from Madurai
Indian male comedians
Male actors in Tamil cinema
Tamil comedians
Tamil male television actors
21st-century Indian male actors
Year of birth missing (living people)